Lord Haw-Haw was a nickname applied to William Joyce, who broadcast Nazi propaganda to the UK from Germany during the Second World War. The broadcasts opened with "Germany calling, Germany calling", spoken in an affected upper-class English accent.

The same nickname was also applied to some other broadcasters of English-language propaganda from Germany, but it is Joyce with whom the name is now overwhelmingly identified.

Aim of broadcasts
The English-language propaganda radio programme Germany Calling was broadcast to audiences in the United Kingdom on the medium wave station Reichssender Hamburg and by shortwave to the United States. The programme began on 18 September 1939 and continued until 30 April 1945, when the British Army overran Hamburg. The next scheduled broadcast was made by Horst Pinschewer (also known as Geoffrey Perry), a German-Jewish refugee serving in the British Army who announced the British takeover. Pinschewer was later responsible for the capture of William Joyce.

Through such broadcasts, the Reich Ministry of Public Enlightenment and Propaganda attempted to discourage and demoralise American, Australian, British, and Canadian troops, and the British population, to suppress the effectiveness of the Allied war effort through propaganda, and to motivate the Allies to agree to peace terms leaving the Nazi regime intact and in power. Among many techniques used, the Nazi broadcasts reported on the shooting down of Allied aircraft and the sinking of Allied ships, presenting discouraging reports of high losses and casualties among Allied forces. Although the broadcasts were well known to be Nazi propaganda, they frequently offered the only details available from behind enemy lines concerning the fate of friends and relatives who did not return from bombing raids over Germany. As a result, Allied troops and civilians frequently listened to Lord Haw-Haw's broadcasts despite the often inflammatory content and frequent inaccuracies and exaggerations, in the hope of hearing clues as to the fate of Allied troops and air crews. Mass-Observation interviews warned the Ministry of Information of this; consequently, more attention was given to the official reports of British military casualties.

Origin of the name
In a newspaper article of 14 September 1939, the radio critic Jonah Barrington of the Daily Express wrote of hearing a gent "moaning periodically from Zeesen" who "speaks English of the haw-haw, damit-get-out-of-my-way variety". Four days later, he gave him the nickname 'Lord Haw-Haw'. He wrote scathingly:

I imagine him having a receding chin, a questing nose, thin yellow hair brushed back, a monocle, a vacant eye, a gardenia in his buttonhole. Rather like PG Wodehouse's Bertie Wooster…

The voice Barrington heard is widely believed to be that of Wolf Mittler, a German journalist whose near-flawless English sounded like a caricature of an upper-crust Englishman. However, Mittler only made five or six broadcasts and was quickly replaced by other broadcasters, leading to uncertainty over whom Barrington had been referring to. Some British media and listeners used "Lord Haw-Haw" as a generic term to describe all English-language German broadcasters, although other nicknames, like "Sinister Sam", were occasionally used by the BBC to distinguish among obviously different speakers.  Poor reception may have contributed to some listeners' difficulties in distinguishing between broadcasters.  By the end of 1939, when Joyce had become the most prominent and regular broadcaster of English-language Nazi propaganda, the name was applied exclusively to him. Indeed, the Germans soon capitalised on the publicity generated in Britain and began announcing Joyce's talks as by "William Joyce, otherwise known as Lord Haw-Haw".

In reference to the nickname, American pro-Nazi broadcaster Fred W. Kaltenbach was given the moniker Lord Hee-Haw by the British media. The Lord Hee-Haw name, however, was used for a time by The Daily Telegraph to refer to Lord Haw-Haw, generating some confusion between nicknames and broadcasters.

Announcers associated with the nickname
A number of announcers could have been Lord Haw-Haw:
 Wolf Mittler is widely believed to be the voice that Jonah Barrington originally wrote about, thus making Mittler the original 'Lord Haw-Haw'. Mittler, who was a German journalist, spoke near-flawless English which he had learned from his mother, who had been born of German parents in Ireland. His persona was described by some listeners as similar to the fictional aristocrat Bertie Wooster. It was said that he found broadcasting political matters distasteful and that he was happy to be replaced. One of those who replaced him, Norman Baillie-Stewart, stated that Mittler "sounded almost like a caricature of an Englishman". Mittler told the BBC in 1991 that it "can't have been more than five or six times" that he made the broadcasts "because I remember quite distinctly that these two chaps, Stewart and Joyce, popped up and relieved me of the job". In 1943, Mittler was deemed suspect and arrested by the Gestapo, but he managed to escape to Switzerland. After the war, he worked extensively for German radio and television.
 Norman Baillie-Stewart was a former officer of the Seaforth Highlanders who was cashiered for selling secrets to Nazi Germany. He worked as a broadcaster for the German broadcaster RRG for a short time between August and December 1939. He was jailed for five years by the British after the war. For a time he claimed that he was the original Lord Haw-Haw. He did have an upper-class accent, but he later decided that it was probably Mittler whose voice Barrington had heard. He may, however, have been the broadcaster the BBC referred to as "Sinister Sam".
 Eduard Dietze, a Glasgow-born broadcaster of a mixed German-British-Hungarian family background, is another possible, but less likely, candidate for the original Lord Haw-Haw. He was one of the English-speaking announcers with an "upper-crust accent" who were heard on German radio in the early days of the war.
 James R. Clark was a young English broadcaster and a friend of William Joyce. Clark and his pro-Nazi mother, Mrs. Dorothy Eckersley, were both tried for treason after the war. Dorothy Eckersley was born Dorothy Stephen in 1893. She later married Edward Clark, a musician, and had a son, James Clark, who was born in 1923. She divorced her first husband and was married to Peter Eckersley, a senior figure working in the British Broadcasting Corporation (BBC). After ten years of marriage to Peter Eckersley, Dorothy's increasing interest in German National Socialism and fascism led her to move to Germany with her son, enrolling him (by then aged 17 years) in a German school. Following this move, "...Dorothy Eckersley came to play a key role in William Joyce's fate in Berlin..."

William Joyce 

William Joyce replaced Mittler in 1939. Joyce was American-born and raised in Ireland and as a teenager he was an informant to the British forces about the IRA members during the Irish War of Independence. He was also a senior member of the British Union of Fascists and fled England when tipped off about his planned internment on 26 August 1939. In October 1939, the Fascist newspaper Action identified "one of the subsidiary announcers" on German radio, "with a marked nasal intonation", as one of its former members and distanced itself from him as a "renegade", whose broadcasts were "likely only to rouse the fighting ire of the average Briton". 

In February 1940, the BBC noted that the Lord Haw-Haw of the early war days (possibly Mittler) was now rarely heard on the air and had been replaced by a new spokesman. Joyce was the main German broadcaster in English for most of the war, and became a naturalised German citizen; he is usually regarded as Lord Haw-Haw, even though he was probably not the person to whom the term originally referred. He had a peculiar hybrid accent that was not of the conventional upper-class variety. His distinctive nasal pronunciation of "Germany calling, Germany calling" may have been the result of a fight as a schoolboy that left him with a broken nose.

Joyce, initially an anonymous broadcaster like the others, eventually revealed his real name to his listeners. The Germans actually capitalised on the fame of the Lord Haw-Haw nickname and came to announce him as "William Joyce, otherwise known as Lord Haw-Haw".

Later history and aftermath 
After Joyce took over, Mittler was paired with the American-born announcer Mildred Gillars in the Axis Sally programme and also broadcast to ANZAC forces in North Africa. Mittler survived the war and appeared on postwar German radio, and occasionally television, until his death. Baillie-Stewart was sentenced to five years' imprisonment. Joyce was captured by British forces in northern Germany just as the war ended, tried, and eventually hanged for treason on 3 January 1946. Joyce's defence team, appointed by the court, argued that, as an American citizen and naturalised German, Joyce could not be convicted of treason against the British Crown. However, the prosecution successfully argued that, since he had lied about his nationality to obtain a British passport and voted in Britain, Joyce owed allegiance to the king.

In Haw-Haw: The Tragedy of William and Margaret Joyce, the author Nigel Farndale presents evidence that shows that, during his trial, Joyce may have agreed not to reveal his pre-war links with Maxwell Knight, the head of the MI5 section B5(b), as part of a deal to spare his wife Margaret, a “Germany Calling” broadcaster known as Lady Haw-Haw, from prosecution for treason.  

As J. A. Cole has written, "the British public would not have been surprised if, in that Flensburg wood [where he was captured], Haw-Haw had carried in his pocket a secret weapon capable of annihilating an armoured brigade". This mood was reflected in the wartime film Sherlock Holmes and the Voice of Terror (1942), starring Basil Rathbone and Nigel Bruce, in which Joyce's broadcasts are shown to predict actual disasters and defeats, thus, according to the storyline, seriously undermining British morale.

Other British subjects who broadcast
Other British subjects willingly made propaganda broadcasts, including Raymond Davies Hughes, who broadcast on the German Radio Metropole, and John Amery. P. G. Wodehouse was tricked into broadcasting, not propaganda, but rather his own satiric accounts of his capture by the Germans and civil internment as an enemy alien, by a German friend who assured him that the talks would be broadcast only to the neutral United States. They were, however, relayed to the UK on a little-known channel. An MI5 investigation, conducted shortly after Wodehouse's release from Germany, but published only after his death, found no evidence of treachery.

In popular culture

Film
In the 1940s, actor Geoffrey Sumner played Lord Haw-Haw for laughs in a series of Pathé Gazette short subjects named "Nasti" News From Lord Haw-Haw.
The 1943 animated propaganda cartoon Tokio Jokio has a brief sequence with an anthropomorphic donkey wearing a monocle, seated at a desk with a sign reading "Lord Hee-Haw, Chief Wind Bag", as he reads from a script into a microphone.
In the movie Twelve O'Clock High (1949), American bomber commanders listen to a Lord Haw-Haw broadcast.
In the movie The Dirty Dozen (1967) a brief portion of a Lord Haw-Haw broadcast is heard.
In the movie Sardar Udham (2021), a Lord Haw-Haw broadcast announces the assassination of Michael O'Dwyer.

Print
In the novels Flashman (1969) and Flashman at the Charge (1973), from the series of historical novels by George MacDonald Fraser, the main character Harry Flashman refers to James Brudenell, 7th Earl of Cardigan, who led the disastrous Charge of the Light Brigade, as "Lord Haw-Haw" due to his tendency to sprinkle his conversation with the phrase "haw-haw". The Earl was noted as using the phrase in real life.
 The main character of Kurt Vonnegut's Mother Night (1962), Howard W. Campbell Jr., is a Nazi propagandist modeled after Lord Haw-Haw.
The fourth issue of the American comic book series Sgt. Fury and his Howling Commandos, by Jack Kirby and Stan Lee (1963), features Lord Ha-Ha, a pro-Nazi British broadcaster. Unlike William Joyce, Lord Ha-Ha is a British aristocrat, Sir Percival Hawley.

Theatre
A comedy revue, Haw-Haw!, produced by George Black with sketches by Max Miller and Ben Lyon, opened at the Holborn Empire theatre in London on 22 December 1939.
Joyce's radio broadcasts and his relationship with his wife were dramatised in the stage play Double Cross (1983), by Thomas Kilroy. Stephen Rea played the role of Joyce.

See also 
 Axis Sally
 British Free Corps
 Hanoi Hannah
 Pyongyang Sally
 Tokyo Rose

References 
Notes

Bibliography

Farndale, Nigel (2005). Haw-Haw: The Tragedy of William and Margaret Joyce. Macmillan

External links 
Lord Haw-Haw at the BBC Archive, including documents and broadcasts.
 
"Secret files released on Lord Haw Haw's wife", an 11 November 2000 CNN article
"Obituary: Geoffrey Perry: Soldier who captured Lord Haw-Haw by shooting him in the backside then forged a noted publishing empire", 17 October 2014, from The Independent
"My Father and Lord Haw Haw", a February 2005 story from The Guardian
Archive of Lord Haw-Haw broadcasts at Earth Station 1
"Haw-Haw's Dodge": 20 November 1941 Time article

British radio personalities
Collaboration with Nazi Germany
Collective pseudonyms
Nicknames in radio
German radio personalities
Nazi propagandists
Nazi propaganda radio
Radio during World War II
Treason in the United Kingdom
Radio controversies